The Masterkey is a door breaching shotgun system manufactured by Knight's Armament Company.

The Masterkey project was initiated during the 1980s to provide assault rifles with a potent built-in door breaching tool. Individual soldiers were often forced to carry a breaching shotgun in addition to their standard issue rifle, but the Masterkey removes this need. The system consists of a Remington 870 12 gauge pump-action shotgun mounted on an M16 or M4 assault rifle in an underbarrel configuration, much like the M203 grenade launcher. It has a 3-round internal magazine and can carry a fourth round in the chamber.

The shotgun can only be awkwardly operated independently because it has no grip behind the trigger—when firing the Masterkey, the rifle's magazine must be used as a makeshift pistol grip. Independent stocks and grips for the 870 are available for use, but they are incompatible with the M16 barrel mount. KAC makes an independent stock for the Masterkey that also can be used with the M203 grenade launcher.

The Masterkey inspired the M26 Modular Accessory Shotgun System, an attachable shotgun in use with the United States Army.  The M26 was chosen by the Army over the Masterkey as a breaching tool.

The weapon is named "Masterkey" in reference to its ability to "unlock" virtually any standard lock.

Users
 : Delta Force

See also
 Ciener Ultimate Over/Under
 Combat shotgun
 M26 MASS

References

External links
 Knight's Armament Masterkey Page

Pump-action shotguns
Shotguns of the United States